The Shouting End of Life is an album by the British folk rock group Oysterband, released in 1995. The album was vehemently political, and showed a much harder, punkier side than previous albums.

The album peaked at No. 96 on the UK Albums Chart.

Critical reception

The Toronto Star lamented "the passing of the more subtle side of Oysterband, which allowed fiddle, winds and cello and youthful enthusiasm to color new light into the traditional."

AllMusic wrote that "though British folk has been a major influence on the Oyster Band, much of this CD finds them favoring a Celtic-influenced exuberance."

Track listing
 "We'll be There" (Telfer, Jones, Prosser) - 3:22
 "Blood-Red Roses" (Telfer, Prosser) - 4:06
 "Jam Tomorrow" (Telfer, Jones, Prosser) - 4:10
 "By Northern Light" (Telfer, Jones, Prosser, Chopper) - 3:47
 "The Shouting End of Life" (Telfer, Jones, Prosser) - 3:26
 "Long Dark Street" (Telfer, Jones, Prosser) - 3:48
 "Our Lady of the Bottles" (Telfer, Jones, Prosser) - 3:07
 "Everywhere I Go" (Telfer, Jones, Prosser) - 3:48
 "Put Out the Lights" (Telfer, Prosser) - 3:34
 "Voices" (Telfer, Jones, Prosser, Chopper) - 4:42
 "Don't Slit Your Wrists for Me" (Telfer, Jones, Prosser) - 3:46
 "The World Turned Upside Down" (Leon Rosselson) - 3:03

References

External links 
 official website

1995 albums
Oysterband albums
Cooking Vinyl albums